Keystone High School is a high school in Knox, Pennsylvania. There are about 600 students and 40 faculty members at the school. The school is one of seven public high schools in Clarion County. Students, if they wish to pursue a vocational trade, may attend the Clarion County Career Center in Shippenville part-time.

Alma Mater
The Alma Mater  for Keystone is as follows:
Keystone High our Alma Mater,
Fount of wisdom, truth and light: 
Thee we love on thee rely,
For thy guidance always right.
We sing out thy fame and honor, 
We recall thy ideals true,
 As we strive with hope anew.

We salute thee Keystone High School,
Praise to thee we loud proclaim;
As we strive to bring thee glory,
Paying tribute to thy name.
Memories pleasant, classmates loyal, All are treasures we hold dear,
As we face each future year.

Graduation Requirements
Students at Keystone need to earn 24 credits  in grades 9–12, pass the PSSA, as well as complete a Senior Project.

Course Structure

Courses Available
There are several courses  available
 Art
 Business – Including: Desktop Publishing and Webpage Design
 English
 Family and Consumer Sciences – Including: Sewing
 Foreign Language – Includes: French, Spanish and possible courses in  Latin and Japanese via satellite.
 Health and Physical Education
 Industrial Technology – Includes: Wood shop, Drafting, and Airbrush courses
 Mathematics
 Music
 Science
 Social Studies
 Traffic Safety

Clubs
The following is a list of major clubs at KHS, depending on the need more clubs will open up as needed:
 Student Council
 National Honor Society
 Yearbook
 Panther Peers – Tutoring/Mediation club
 Keystone Youth Education Assn. (A chapter of Future Teachers of America)
 French Students to Europe
 Fellowship of Christian Students

High School Athletics 
Keystone participates in PIAA District IX (9)

Alumni
Ross A. McGinnis – Iraq war hero and medal of honor recipient

References

Public high schools in Pennsylvania
Schools in Clarion County, Pennsylvania
Public middle schools in Pennsylvania